Hoani Nahi (c. 1833 – 18 May 1894), also spelled Hoani Nahe, was a Māori member of the House of Representatives, author and historian.

Biography

Early life and career
He was born in 1833 or 1834.

His life work was recording Māori history and tradition, particularly of Tainui and Hauraki. He was also involved in contemporary affairs such as land disputes, as at Parawai in 1894 where he contracted a cold, later an inflammation, and died.

Member of Parliament

He was the third MP for Western Maori from 1876, when he defeated Te Keepa Te Rangihiwinui and the incumbent, Wiremu Parata. He retired at the subsequent election in 1879. He was a minister without portfolio, and on the Executive Council of the Grey Ministry (17 November 1877 – 8 October 1879).

Notes

References

  Hoani Nahe in Cyclopaedia of New Zealand (Wellington Provincial District, 1897)

New Zealand MPs for Māori electorates
Members of the Cabinet of New Zealand
19th-century New Zealand historians
1833 births
1894 deaths
Ngāti Maru (Hauraki)
Members of the New Zealand House of Representatives
19th-century New Zealand politicians